University Hospital is an American medical drama series that aired from January 16 to May 1, 1995. It was part of a syndicated package of shows called the Spelling Premiere Network.

Premise
The series is about four student nurses at a university hospital.

Cast

Main

 Rebecca Cross as Megan Peterson
 Hillary Danner as Jamie Fuller
 Hudson Leick as Tracy Stone
 Alexandra Wilson as Samantha "Sam" McCormick

 Tonya Pinkins as Nurse Jenkins

Recurring
 Doug Wert as Dr. Rob Daniels
 Michael Palance as Mark

Episodes

References

External links

1995 American television series debuts
1995 American television series endings
1990s American drama television series
1990s American medical television series
English-language television shows
First-run syndicated television programs in the United States
Television series by Spelling Television
Television series by CBS Studios
Television shows filmed in Vancouver